Conor Sims Jackson (born May 7, 1982) is an American former professional baseball first baseman and left fielder. He played in Major League Baseball (MLB) between 2005 and 2011 for the Arizona Diamondbacks, Oakland Athletics, and Boston Red Sox. His father is actor John M. Jackson.

College and minor leagues
After graduating from El Camino Real High School in Woodland Hills, California in 2000, Jackson proceeded to have a stellar collegiate career at the University of California (Berkeley) as a third baseman. In 2001, he played collegiate summer baseball in the Cape Cod Baseball League for the Bourne Braves. Jackson was drafted in the first round (19th overall) of the 2003 MLB amateur draft.

Jackson switched to the outfield shortly after being drafted. In his initial debut with Yakima of the short-season Northwest League, he batted .319 with a league record 35 doubles. After his minor league debut, Jackson successfully climbed the minor league ladder.  After fielding only .964 in the outfield in the minors, he was moved to first base, where his defensive struggles continued.

Major leagues

Arizona Diamondbacks (2005-2010)

In  he claimed the Diamondbacks' starting first base job. He finished the season with a .291 average with 15 home runs in 140 games. Jackson played a vast majority of first base for the D-Backs.

Although he missed some time in 2007 due to injury, he wound up hitting 15 home runs with 60 rbi's in 130 games, he hit .235 in 17 at bats in the postseason.

In , Jackson started the season with a hot bat as the Diamondbacks took an early lead in the NL West. Conor had the opportunity to hit for the cycle in a game against San Diego on April 18.  Facing Greg Maddux in his last at bat, Jackson hit a deep line drive to center field, and instead of stopping at second base for the double and the cycle, he continued on to third base for his second triple of the game.  It would have been Jackson's first career cycle.  He finished the game with four hits, tying his career high, and was later named National League Player of the Week for his 12 hits, 10 runs, 10 RBIs, and three home runs from April 14 through April 20. Jackson set career highs in Average (.300), plate appearances (612), at bats (540), runs (87) and stolen bases (10) while splitting the season between playing left field and first base.

His  season was stalled in May when he contracted Valley Fever and lost approximately 35 pounds during the illness (per his interview on Chronicle Live 6/21/10). "I'm tired. I'm fatigued. Some days I feel like I'm able to do stuff, and I do stuff. I sleep 12, 13 hours and I'm exhausted." Jackson would play in just 30 games in 2009 batting a .182 batting average with 1 home run and 14 RBI.

In 2010, he was hitting .238 for the Diamondbacks before being traded to the A's.

Oakland Athletics (2010-2011)
On June 15, 2010, Jackson was traded with cash considerations to the Oakland Athletics for pitcher Sam Demel. After the demotion of Daric Barton in the spring of 2011, Jackson saw the majority of his starts at first-base until the call-up of trade acquisition Brandon Allen. Jackson would only play in 18 games for the A's that year and only 60 for the entire season, finishing with a .236 batting average 2 home runs and 16 RBI.

He would play in 102 games for the Athletics in 2011 before being traded to the Boston Red Sox.

Boston Red Sox (2011)
On August 31, 2011, Jackson was traded to the Boston Red Sox for a minor league player. On September 19, he hit his first home run in a Red Sox uniform, a grand slam over the "Green Monster" at Fenway Park, in an 18–9 rout of the Baltimore Orioles. That however would be his final home run of the season as Jackson only played 12 games with Boston. He would finish that year with a .244 batting average, 5 home runs, and 43 RBI.

Minor league deals and retirement
On February 6, 2012, Jackson signed a minor league deal with the Texas Rangers. He was released on March 26.

On March 31, 2012, Jackson signed a minor league deal with the Chicago White Sox, and was assigned to Triple-A Charlotte.

On December 5, 2012, Jackson was signed to a minor league deal with the Baltimore Orioles that included a spring training invitation. He later announced his retirement on April 14, 2013.

References

External links

Conor Jackson Interview at Baseball Digest Daily - May 2005

Living people
1982 births
Major League Baseball first basemen
Baseball players from Austin, Texas
Yakima Bears players
Lancaster JetHawks players
El Paso Diablos players
Tucson Sidewinders players
Visalia Rawhide players
Arizona League Athletics players
Stockton Ports players
Reno Aces players
Sacramento River Cats players
Charlotte Knights players
Norfolk Tides players
Arizona Diamondbacks players
Oakland Athletics players
Boston Red Sox players
California Golden Bears baseball players
Bourne Braves players
University of California, Berkeley alumni
El Camino Real High School alumni